David John Conner,   (born 6 April 1947) is a British Anglican bishop. He has served as Dean of Windsor since 1998, and was additionally the Bishop to the Forces between 2001 and 2009. He previously served as Bishop of Lynn, a suffragan bishop of the Diocese of Norwich, from 1994 to 1998, and in school chaplaincy. Conner has announced his intention to retire effective 31 July 2023.

Biography
Conner is the son of William Ernest Conner and Joan Millington Conner. He was educated at Erith Grammar School, then Exeter College, Oxford and St Stephen's House, Oxford. He was ordained as deacon on 29 June 1971 by Christopher Pepys, Bishop of Buckingham at St Martin's, Fenny Stratford. Having also spent a year at the Oxford Department of Education, soon after ordination he moved into chaplaincy at St Edward's School, Oxford (where he was ordained priest in 1972 by Kenneth Woollcombe, Bishop of Oxford, in the School Chapel) from 1971 to 1980, and later at Winchester. For a while, he was an examining chaplain to the Bishop of Winchester. From 1987 to 1994 he was Vicar of Great St Mary's the University Church, Cambridge.  He served as Bishop of Lynn from 1994 to 1998, in which year he was appointed Dean of Windsor; in this role, Conner also holds the post of Register of the Order of the Garter and was a domestic chaplain to Elizabeth II. From 2001 to 2009 he was also Bishop to the Forces. He was consecrated as bishop on 2 February 1994 at St Paul's Cathedral, by George Carey, Archbishop of Canterbury. His installation at Windsor on 7 December 1998 was attended by Elizabeth II and Prince Philip, Duke of Edinburgh; he later presided over both of their interments in the King George VI Memorial Chapel on 19 September 2022, after the Queen's committal ceremony.

For many years Conner has been closely involved with the selection of candidates for ordination and with the inspection of theological colleges, courses and schemes. He has been governor of a number of schools and colleges. He is an honorary fellow of Girton College, Cambridge.

Honours
Conner was appointed Knight Commander of the Royal Victorian Order (KCVO) in the 2010 New Year Honours.

Personal life
In 1969, Conner married Jayne Maria Evans; they have two sons.

References

1947 births
Alumni of Exeter College, Oxford
Alumni of St Stephen's House, Oxford
21st-century Church of England bishops
20th-century Church of England bishops
Fellows of Girton College, Cambridge
Bishops of Lynn
Deans of Windsor
Bishops to the Forces
Honorary Chaplains to the Queen
Living people
Knights Commander of the Royal Victorian Order
Registrars of the Order of the Garter